Handling may refer to:
 Automobile handling, the turning characteristics of land vehicles
 Handling of stolen goods, a statutory offence in England and Wales and Northern Ireland

People 
 Adam Handling (born 1988), British chef and restaurateur
 Danny Handling (born 1994), Scottish football player
 Piers Handling (born 1949), Canadian film executive